Nizhneye Ishkarty is a rural locality (a selo) and the administrative centre of Selsoviet, Ishkartinsky Selsoviet, Buynaksky District, Republic of Dagestan, Russia. The population was 998 as of 2010. There are 22 streets.

Geography 
Nizhneye Ishkarty is located 15 km northwest of Buynaksk (the district's administrative centre) by road. Verkhneye Ishkarty is the nearest rural locality.

References 

Rural localities in Buynaksky District